Mfundo Kevin Ndhlovu (born 5 April 1997) is a South African rugby sevens player for the South Africa national team. His regular position is wing.

Playing career

Ndhlovu made his debut for the South Africa national sevens team at the 2018 Hong Kong Sevens, and also appeared in the 2018 Paris Sevens, where he was a member of a squad that not only won the tournament, but also won the 2017–18 World Rugby Sevens Series title.

In 2022, He was part of the South African team that won their second Commonwealth Games gold medal in Birmingham.

References

External links
 

South African rugby union players
Living people
1997 births
People from Standerton
Rugby union wings
South Africa international rugby sevens players
Rugby sevens players at the 2022 Commonwealth Games
Commonwealth Games gold medallists for South Africa
Commonwealth Games medallists in rugby sevens
Medallists at the 2022 Commonwealth Games